XHERN-FM is a radio station on 100.9 FM in Montemorelos, Nuevo León. The station is owned by Grupo Mass Comunicaciones and is known as Radio Naranjera.

History
XERN-AM received its concession on July 21, 1967. It broadcast as a daytimer on 950 kHz with 1 kW. In the 1990s, it increased its power to 5 kW and began broadcasting with 1 kW at night.

In the 1990s and 2000s, XERN had a sister station on FM in Montemorelos, XHMSN-FM 100.1. That station was moved into Monterrey and now broadcasts on 96.5 MHz in that city.
 
In October 2011, XERN was authorized to migrate to FM.

References

Radio stations in Nuevo León
Radio stations established in 1967